Liesl Folks is an Australian-American engineer who is Professor and Senior Vice President for Academic Affairs at the University of Arizona. She has conducted research on magnetic materials and spintronic devices.

Early life and education 
Folks is from Australia. She attended the University of Western Australia. She studied physics for her bachelor's degree, before starting a doctorate in the characterisation of ferromagnetic materials. In particular, she has conducted research on the analysis of transient properties of ferromagnetics. After graduating Folks joined the Faculty of the University of Western Australia as a postdoctoral research fellow, and conducted research on nanoscale permanent magnetic materials.

Research and career 
Folks joined IBM, where she worked on the commercialisation of spintronic devices. She conducted research in the area of magnetic data storage and magnetic force microscopy imaging. She moved to Hitachi with the hard disk drive business in 2003. Whilst working as a researcher at Hitachi, Folks spent a year at Cornell University where she completed a Master of Business Administration. Alongside her hands-on research, Folks worked on engineering education programs, including initiatives for pre-kindergarten and K–12 education. She created a summer program for graduate students to study magnetic materials. In 2013, she was awarded the AVS Excellence in Leadership Award.

After serving as a researcher from 1998 to 2013 at IBM and Hitachi, without any prior academic leadership or management experience, in 2013 after receiving an MBA from Cornell University, Folks was appointed Dean of the University at Buffalo. That year she was also appointed in the voluntary role of President of the Institute of Electrical and Electronics Engineers Magnetics Society, a professional society. Her research concentrates on magnetic materials and spintronic devices. At the University at Buffalo, she focussed on improving diversity and equity in science, with a particular focus on championing women and other historically marginalized groups. She was the Dean of Engineering when two new departments were launched; materials design (a joint initiative at UB between to the School of Engineering & Applied Sciences and the College of Arts and Sciences) and engineering education. She joined the University of Arizona as Senior Vice President and Provost in 2019.
In 2021, Folks was elected Fellow of the National Academy of Inventors.

Selected publications 

Liesl Folks is a co-author on about 100 publications and a leading or first author on ~ 20 publications (https://scholar.google.com/citations?user=wni5L9IAAAAJ&hl=en).  Her top-cited, first author publications are shown below.  She has about 1000 citations from first author publications.

1) Perforated tips for high-resolution in-plane magnetic force microscopy, L. Folks, M. E. Best, P. M. Rice, B. D. Terris, and D. Weller, Appl. Phys. Lett. 76, 909 (2000). https://doi.org/10.1063/1.125626. Citations including self: 83.

2) The use of MFM for investigating domain structures in modern permanent magnet materials, L. Folks and R.C. Woodward, Journal of Magnetism and Magnetic Materials, Volume 190, Issues 1–2, 1 December 1998, Pages 28-41. https://doi.org/10.1016/S0304-8853(98)00272-8.  Citations including self: 78.

3) Analysis and interpretation of time dependent magnetic phenomena, L. Folks and R. Street, Journal of Applied Physics 76, 6391 (1994). https://doi.org/10.1063/1.358276.  Citations including self: 58.

4) Investigation of interaction mechanisms in melt‐quenched NdFeB, L. Folks, R. Street, and R. Woodward, Journal of Applied Physics 75, 6271 (1994). https://doi.org/10.1063/1.355421.  Citations including self: 43

References 

Living people
Year of birth missing (living people)
American women engineers
University of Arizona faculty
Australian women engineers
University of Western Australia alumni
Cornell University alumni
American women academics
21st-century American women
Fellows of the National Academy of Inventors